Aleksandr Aleksandrovich Shidlovsky (Александр Александрович Шидловский; born 14 July 1974) is a Russian-born Kazakhstani water polo player. He was a member of the Kazakhstan men's national water polo team, playing as a driver. He was a part of the team at the 2004 Summer Olympics.

References

1974 births
Living people
Kazakhstani male water polo players
Water polo players at the 2004 Summer Olympics
Olympic water polo players of Kazakhstan
Place of birth missing (living people)
Asian Games medalists in water polo
Water polo players at the 2002 Asian Games
Asian Games gold medalists for Kazakhstan
Medalists at the 2002 Asian Games